Keeper of My Soul is an album led by pianist Walter Bishop Jr. which was recorded in 1973 and originally released on the Black Jazz label.

Track listing 
All compositions by Walter Bishop Jr. except where noted.
 "Soul Village" – 6:25
 "N'dugu's Prayer" – 4:38
 "Summertime" (George Gershwin, Ira Gershwin) – 5:49
 "Those Who Chant" – 7:48
 "Keeper of My Soul" – 4:49
 "Blue Bossa" (Kenny Dorham) – 3:14
 "Sweet Rosa" – 5:25

Personnel 
Walter Bishop Jr. – piano, electric piano
Ronnie Laws – flute, saxophone
Woody Murray – vibraphone
Gerald Brown – bass, electric bass
Bahir Hassan – drums 
Shakur M. Abdulla – congas, bongos

References 

Walter Bishop Jr. albums
1973 albums
Black Jazz Records albums